John Gleeson may refer to:
John Gleeson (cricketer) (1938–2016), Australian cricketer
John Gleeson (hurler) (born 1941), former Irish hurler
John Gleeson (judge) (born 1953), American judge
John Gleeson (rugby league) (1938–2021), Australian rugby league footballer
Johnny Tom Gleeson (1853–1924), Irish poet and songwriter